The 2013 Liège–Bastogne–Liège was the 99th running of Liège–Bastogne–Liège, a single-day cycling race. The race was won by Dan Martin of  after he placed a late attack out of a group led by his teammate Ryder Hesjedal, to catch and eventually distance Joaquim Rodríguez who had to settle for second, while Alejandro Valverde won the sprint for third place.

Teams
As Liège–Bastogne–Liège is a UCI World Tour event, all 19 UCI ProTeams were automatically invited and obligated to send a squad. Six other squads were given wildcard places into the race, and as such, will formed the event's 25-team peloton.

The 19 UCI ProTeams that competed in the race:

The 6 teams who were given wild cards:

Results

References

External links

Liège–Bastogne–Liège
Liege-Bastogne-Liege
Liege-Bastogne-Liege